Collingwood Cove is a hamlet in Alberta, Canada within Strathcona County.

Commonly referred to as The Cove, Collingwood Cove started growing in the early 1950s as a popular summer lakeside resort. It was popular due to its proximity to Edmonton and its location on Cooking Lake, which was, at that time, one of the best lakes for recreational activities in the region.

Since 1990, there have been several new developments in the hamlet, such as new homes, a modern playground with basketball hoops and a seasonal ice surface. There has also been an active community association that hosts Canada Day celebrations, sleigh rides, skating parties and regular nature walks for the children.

Demographics 
The population of Collingwood Cove according to the 2022 municipal census conducted by Strathcona County is 375, a decrease increase from its 2018 municipal census population count of 376.

See also 
List of communities in Alberta
List of designated places in Alberta
List of hamlets in Alberta

References 

Hamlets in Alberta
Strathcona County
Designated places in Alberta